Pietroșani is a commune in Teleorman County, Muntenia, Romania. It is composed of a single village, Pietroșani.

Located at the southeast extremity of the county, Pietroșani borders Giurgiu County. As a village, it dates to 1659; it was declared a commune in 1861.

Local features include ruins of the 1812 Holy Trinity Church, and a World War I monument from 1924.

References

Communes in Teleorman County
Localities in Muntenia
1659 establishments in Europe